Kien or Kiens may refer to:

 Kien, Bern, a village in Bern, Switzerland
 Kien, Burkina Faso, a village
 Kien (album), a 2008 album by the Japanese group Bleach
 Pine Ridge Airport (ICAO: KIEN), Pine Ridge, South Dakota , US
 Kiens, a comune in South Tyrol, Italy

People
 Kiến Phúc (1869–1884), Vietnamese emperor
 Foo Wan Kien, Malaysian businessman
 Shih Kien, Hong Kong actor

See also
 Kiên Thành (disambiguation)
 Kiến Thành (disambiguation)